Rexhep Spahiu (21 January 1923 – 12 January 1993) was an Albanian football player and coach.

Nicknamed Xhepi, he spent his playing career with Sportklub Tiranë and Partizani Tirana, before becoming the head coach of Partizani, Apolonia Fier, Korabi Peshkopi and Besa Kavajë.

International career
He made his debut for Albania in an October 1946 Balkan Cup match against Yugoslavia, which was Albania's first official match. He earned a total of 20 caps, scoring no goals. His final international was a December 1952 friendly match against Czechoslovakia.

Honours
 as a player
Kategoria Superiore (1): 1954
 as a manager
Kategoria Superiore (4): 1957, 1958, 1959, 1961.

References

External links

1923 births
1993 deaths
Footballers from Tirana
Albanian footballers
Association football defenders
Albania international footballers
KF Tirana players
FK Partizani Tirana players
Albanian football managers
FK Partizani Tirana managers
KF Apolonia Fier managers
KF Korabi Peshkopi managers
Besa Kavajë managers
Kategoria Superiore players
Kategoria Superiore managers